Chhitampatti is a small village at the bank of river Ganga at the Mirzapur district of Uttar Pradesh, India. The main settlers of this village are Brahmins. This village is 12 km north-east to Mirzapur district headquarters.

Economy
The main economy of this village is agriculture and its allied activities. Rice, wheat, gram, sugarcane etc. are used to cultivate in this village. Apart from this, animal husbandry is also the major activity of the village people.

Ethnic groups
The major ethnic groups of this village are the Hindus. Most of the houses belongs to the Brahmins. They used to worship Lord Vishnu, Shiva, Durga, Surya, Ganga.

Work Profile
In Chhitampatti village out of total population, 214 were engaged in work activities. 65.89% of workers describe their work as Main Work (Employment or Earning more than 6 Months) while 34.11% were involved in Marginal activity providing livelihood for less than 6 months. Of 214 workers engaged in Main Work, 93 were cultivators (owner or co-owner) while 32 were Agricultural labourer.

Chhitampatti Data
According to the 2011 Census, Chhitampatti data are as under:

References

Villages in Mirzapur district